Southesk is a civil parish in Northumberland County, New Brunswick, Canada.

For governance purposes it is divided between the Indian reserve of Red Bank 4, the incorporated rural community of Miramichi River Valley, and the Greater Miramichi rural district, the last two of which are members of the Greater Miramichi Regional Service Commission.

Prior to the 2023 governance reform, all of the parish outside the Indian reserve formed the local service district of the parish of South Esk.

Origin of name
The parish takes its name from its position relative to Northesk Parish.

History
Southesk was erected in 1879 from Northesk Parish south of the Northwest Miramichi River and a northwestern line starting at the mouth of the Little Southwest Miramichi River. The Derby Parish boundary was significantly differently than it is today.

Boundaries
Southesk Parish is bounded:

 on the north, beginning on the Victoria County line at a point about 150 metres south-southeast of Route 385, then running south 45º east to the mouth of the Little Southwest Miramichi River, then down the Northwest Miramichi River to a point about 825 metres downstream of the Route 8 bridge;
 on the east by line from the middle of the Northwest Miramichi River to the northeastern corner of a grant to Charles Vye Sr., about 700 metres east of Enclosure Road;
 on the south by a line beginning at the northeastern corner of the Vye grant, then westerly in a straight line 116 chains (about 2.3 kilometres) to the southeastern line of a grant to Stephen Sherwood at a point about 700 metres slightly east of south of the junction of Route 420 and Creamer Road, then northwesterly to Old Creamer Road, then southwesterly about 600 metres along Old Creamer Road to the southwestern line of a grant to James Oxford, then northwesterly along the Oxford grant to its westernmost corner, then southwesterly and northwesterly along the rear line of grants on the Southwest Miramichi River, then northwesterly and southwesterly to exclude a grant to Jared Betts on the northeastern side of Williamstown Road, then southeasterly along Williamstown Road to rejoin the rear line of Southwest Miramichi River grants, then generally southwesterly along the river grants before turning westerly to exclude several inland grants straddling Route 8 south of Crocker Lake, then southwesterly to Route 8 at the northwest line of the Elm Tree Tract granted to William Davidson, then southwesterly along the Elm Tree Tract and its prolongation to the Blackville Parish line, about 1.8 kilometres northwesterly of Route 8, then northwesterly about 7 kilometres along a line running north 22º west from the mouth of the Renous River, then south 72º west by an astronomic bearing to the York County line;
 on the west by the York and Victoria county lines.

Evolution of boundaries
Southesk has had the same western, northern, and eastern boundaries from its creation; the boundary with Derby was a straight line running a line running south 68º west from modern Wilsons Point.

In 1920 the boundary with Derby Parish was changed to run along property and grant lines. The wording was ambiguous enough to require clarification in 1953 and 1954. The 1954 Act also changed the wording of the boundary with Blackville, Blissfield, and Ludlow Parishes to run partly by an astronomic rather than a magnetic bearing.

Communities
Communities at least partly within the parish. bold indicates an Indian reserve

  Cassilis
 Dennis
 Garden Road
 Halcomb
 Harris Brook Settlement
 Loggie Lodge
 Lyttleton
 Matthews
 Pratts Camp
 Ramsay Lodge
  Red Bank
  Red Bank 4
  Red Bank 7
 Red Rock
  Sillikers
  South Esk
 Warwick Settlement
  Williamstown

Bodies of water
Bodies of water at least partly within the parish.

 Big Sevogle River
 Dungarvon River
 Little Sevogle River
 Little Southwest Miramichi River
 Northwest Miramichi River
 Renous River
 Serpentine River
 Tuadook River
 Crooked Deadwater
 The Horseback
 Little Ottawa Branch
 Northwest Inlet
 Guagus Stream
 Mullin Stream
 North Pole Stream
 Catamaran Lake
 Holmes Lake
 Little Trousers Lakes
 Lost Beaver Lake
 more than eighty other officially named lakes

Islands
Islands at least partly within the parish.
 Gibbons Island
 Johnsons Island

Other notable places
Parks, historic sites, and other noteworthy places at least partly within the parish.
 Adder Lakes Protected Natural Area
 Christmas Mountains
 Gover Mountain Protected Natural Area
 Kennedy Lakes Protected Natural Area
 Little Southwest Miramichi River Protected Natural Area
 Lower North Branch Little Southwest Miramichi River Protected Natural Area
 McCarty Brook Protected Natural Area
 McNeal Brook Protected Natural Area
 Miller Brook Protected Natural Area
 Nalaisk Mountain Protected Natural Area
 North Pole Stream Protected Natural Area
 Patchell Brook Protected Natural Area
 Plaster Rock-Renous Wildlife Management Area
 Tauadook River Protected Natural Area
 Upper Dungarvon River Protected Natural Area
 Wilson's Point Wildlife Refuge

Demographics
Parish population total does not include Indian reserves

Population
Population trend

Language
Mother tongue language (2006)

See also
List of parishes in New Brunswick

Notes

References

Parishes of Northumberland County, New Brunswick